Voerde is a railway station in Voerde, North Rhine-Westphalia, Germany. The station is located on the Arnhem-Oberhausen railway. The train services are operated by Deutsche Bahn and Abellio Deutschland.

History
The station appears to have been opened sometime between 1880 and 1897 on the Oberhausen–Arnhem line, which was opened by the Cologne-Minden Railway Company (Cöln-Mindener Eisenbahn-Gesellschaft, CME) on 20 October 1856. It was opened under the name of Vörde, but it had been renamed Vörde (Bez.Düsseldorf) by 1905. It was renamed Vörde (Niederrh) by 1914 and Voerde (Niederrh) by 1936.

Transport services
Voerde station is served (as of 2020) by the following lines (the Wupper-Lippe-Express operates on weekdays only):

Buses
It is also served by two bus routes operated by NIAG at hourly intervals:
 16 (Friedrichsfeld – Heidesiedlung/Oberemmelsum)
 25 (Friedrichsfeld – Möllen - Dinslaken - Hiesfeld)

See also

 List of railway stations in North Rhine-Westphalia

Notes

External links
NIAG Website 

Railway stations in North Rhine-Westphalia
Buildings and structures in Wesel (district)
Railway stations in Germany opened in 1897